Wuyi New Area was established on June 26, 2012 in Nanping, Fujian.

Administration 
 Wuyishan
 part of Jianyang District: Tancheng Subdistrict, Tongyou Subdistrict, Jiangkou Town, Jukou Town, Huangkeng Town and Chongluo Township.

See also 
 Tianfu New Area
 Fuzhou New Area

Populated places in Fujian
Nanping
New areas (China)